Tant que rien ne m'arrête is the fourth studio album from French singer Claudio Capéo. It was released on 7 December 2018 by Jo & Co. The album includes the singles "Que Dieu me pardonne" and "Ta main". The album has peaked at number 6 on the French Albums Chart.

Commercial performance
On 14 December 2018, the album entered the French Albums Chart at number 6 in its first week of release.

Singles
"Ta main" was released as the lead single from the album on 14 September 2018. "Que Dieu me pardonne" was released as the second single from the album on 15 February 2019. "Plus haut" was released as the third single from the album on 13 May 2019. "Ma jolie" was released as the fourth single from the album on 6 December 2019. "C'est une chanson" was released as the fifth single from the album on 24 April 2020.

Track listing

Charts

Weekly charts

Year-end charts

Certifications

Release history

References

2018 albums